The Battle of Mogyoród took place on 14 March 1074. It was an internal conflict between Solomon, King of Hungary and his cousins duke Géza and Ladislaus, who were claiming rights to the throne.

Solomon ruled for a few years, during which he allegedly submitted the country to the Holy Roman Empire as a vassal state to ensure his power over the kingdom at fear of his relatives usurping the throne. After a series of campaigns directed against the Byzantine Empire, which were led by Duke Géza and Ladislaus, Solomon grew bitter and felt unappreciated because of their success on the field. This provoked numerous actions of the king on their expense and was eventually followed up by attempts of murder. The princes decided to settle this in a battle and it ended favorably for them thanks to the assistance of Otto I of Brno and his forces, who was married to Euphemia, one of the sisters of Ladislaus and Géza.

The injured king fled to Germany soon after the battle and there he aimed to regain the crown with the help of his son-in-law. The outcome of this battle overjoyed all of the nation, since it was regarded as a decisive victory for Hungary's  statehood.

References

Literature
Szalay, J.; Baróti, L. (1896). A Magyar Nemzet Története. Budapest, Hungría: Udvari Könyvkereskedés Kiadó.

External links
https://mek.oszk.hu/09400/09477/html/0003/187.html
http://mek.oszk.hu/00800/00893/html/index.htm
http://mek.niif.hu/02200/02228/html/01/17.html

11th century in Hungary
Battles involving Hungary
Conflicts in 1074
1074 in Europe